Anchista is a genus of beetles in the family Carabidae, containing the following species:

 Anchista brunnea (Wiedemann, 1823)
 Anchista fenestrata (Schmidt-Gobel, 1846)
 Anchista fenestrata subpubescens Chaudoir, 1877
 Anchista nubila Andrewes, 1931
 Anchista pilosa Shi & Liang, 2013

The following species have become synonyms:
 Anchista binotata (Dejean, 1825): Synonym of Paraphaea binotata (Dejean, 1825)
 Anchista discoidalis (Bates, 1892): Synonym of Orionella discoidalis (Bates, 1892)
 Anchista eurydera Chaudoir, 1877: Synonym of Paraphaea binotata (Dejean, 1825)
 Anchista formosana Jedlicka, 1946: Synonym of Paraphaea formosana (Jedlicka, 1946)
 Anchista glabra Chaudoir, 1877: Synonym of Anchista fenestrata (Schmidt-Gobel, 1846)
 Anchista nepalensis Kirschenhofer, 1994: Synonym of Anchista fenestrata (Schmidt-Gobel, 1846)
 Anchista subpubescens Chaudoir, 1877: Synonym of Anchista fenestrata subpubescens Chaudoir, 1877

References

Lebiinae